Novrianto (born 5 November 1992, in Padang) is an Indonesian professional footballer who plays as a centre-back. Novrianto dubbed Andrea Pirlo of indonesia by his friend in the national team of POM ASEAN in Palembang

Club career

Semen Padang
He made his debut against Bali United in four week 2016 Indonesia Soccer Championship A

Persita Tangerang
In 2019, Novrianto signed a contract with Indonesian Liga 2 club Persita Tangerang.

Return to Semen Padang
On 2020, it was confirmed that Novrianto would re-join Semen Padang, signing a year contract. This season was suspended on 27 March 2020 due to the COVID-19 pandemic. The season was abandoned and was declared void on 20 January 2021.

PSPS Riau
In 2021, Novrianto signed a contract with Indonesian Liga 2 club PSPS Riau. He made his league debut on 6 October against Semen Padang at the Gelora Sriwijaya Stadium, Palembang.

Honours 
Semen Padang
 Liga 2 runner-up: 2018
Persita Tangerang
 Liga 2 runner-up: 2019

References

External links
 
 Novrianto at Liga Indonesia

Living people
1992 births
Indonesian footballers
People from Padang
PSPS Pekanbaru players
BaBel United F.C. players
Semen Padang F.C. players
Badak Lampung F.C. players
Persita Tangerang players
Liga 1 (Indonesia) players
Liga 2 (Indonesia) players
Association football defenders
Sportspeople from West Sumatra